The Walther Model 9 was a striker fired semi-automatic pistol produced by  Carl Walther CmbH and chambered in .25 ACP. The decision to use a striker vs. that of an internal hammer like on the Walther Model 8 was to reduce overall size of the gun, but sacrificed reliability. If the striker spring is compressed for extended periods of time it can weaken and not have enough force to ignite the primer causing a miss-fire. This can be avoided by not keeping the pistol cocked when not in use.  It has a 6 round detachable box magazine. The Model 9 is similar in size and function to the Baby Browning pistol which is only slightly larger. The Browning is also chambered in the .25 ACP cartridge.

A Walther Model 9 carried by American Colonel Mickey Marcus is on display at the West Point Museum.

References 

Walther semi-automatic pistols
.25 ACP semi-automatic pistols